André Lacaze (born on 14 December 1930) is a French former rugby league footballer and referee.

Playing career

Rugby league
He started his career for the Villeneuve-sur-Lot club, with which he won a Lord Derby Cup title in 1958 and a French Championship title in 1959. He later joined Toulouse, with which he played a Lord Derby Cup final in 1962. 

Thanks to his club-level performance, he was called up several times for the France national team, taking part as well to the 1960 Rugby League World Cup. Outside his career, he worked as an adjuster.

Referee career
After his playing career, he became a rugby Ieague referee, notably refereeing the French Championship finals in 1968 and 1977.

Honours 

Lord Derby Cup:
Winner in 1958 (Villeneuve-sur-Lot)
Runner up in 1962 (Toulouse)
French Championship:
Winner in 1959 (Villeneuve-sur Lot)

References

External links
André Lacaze profile at rugbyleagueproject.com
André Lacaze referee profile at rugbyleagueproject.com

1930 births
Living people
France international rugby union players
France national rugby league team players
French rugby league players
French rugby union players
People from Lourdes
Rugby league centres
Rugby league second-rows
Toulouse Olympique players
Villeneuve Leopards players